Richard Wolin (born 1952) is an American intellectual historian who writes on 20th Century European philosophy, particularly German philosopher Martin Heidegger and the group of thinkers known collectively as the Frankfurt School.

Life
Wolin graduated B.A. at Reed College, and M.A. and Ph.D. at York University, Toronto. He then worked at Reed College and Rice University. Since 2000, he has been Distinguished Professor of History and Political Science at the CUNY Graduate Center.

Works

Books
Walter Benjamin: An Aesthetic of Redemption. (1982)
The Politics of Being: The Political Thought of Martin Heidegger (1990)
The Heidegger Controversy: A Critical Reader. Editor (1991)
The Terms of Cultural Criticism: The Frankfurt School, Existentialism, Poststructuralism (1992)
Karl Löwith, Martin Heidegger and European Nihilism. (1995) editor).
Labyrinths: Explorations in the Critical History of Ideas.(1995)
Heidegger's Children: Philosophy, Anti-Semitism, and German-Jewish Identity (2001) also as Heidegger's Children: Hannah Arendt, Karl Löwith, Hans Jonas, and Herbert Marcuse
The Seduction of Unreason: The Intellectual Romance with Fascism from Nietzsche to Postmodernism (2004)
Herbert Marcuse, Heideggerian Marxism Co-Editor (2005).
The Frankfurt School Revisited. (2006).
The Wind from the East: French Intellectuals, the Cultural Revolution, and the Legacy of the 1960s.(2010).

Articles
 Telos 41, The De-Aestheticization of Art: On Adorno's Aesthetische Theorie.  New York: Telos Press Ltd., Fall 1979. (Telos Press).
 Telos 43, An Aesthetic of Redemption: Benjamin's Path to Trauerspiel.  New York: Telos Press Ltd., Spring 1980. (Telos Press).
 Telos 53, The Benjamin-Congress: Frankfurt (July 13, 1982).  New York: Telos Press Ltd., Fall 1982. (Telos Press).
 Telos 62, Introduction.  New York: Telos Press Ltd., Winter 1984–1985. (Telos Press).
 Telos 62, Modernism vs. Postmodernism.  New York: Telos Press Ltd., Winter 1984–1985. (Telos Press).
 Telos 63, The Bankruptcy of Left-Wing Kulturkritik: The "After the Avant-Garde" Conference.  New York: Telos Press Ltd., Spring 1985. (Telos Press).
 Telos 64, Against Adjustment.  New York: Telos Press Ltd., Fall 1985. (Telos Press).
 Telos 66, Leonetti-Deutscher-Rizzi Correspondence; False Criteria: The New Criterion or the Cultural Politics of Neo-Conservatism.  New York: Telos Press Ltd., Winter 1985–1986. (Telos Press).
 Telos 67, Foucault's Aesthetic Decisionism.  New York: Telos Press Ltd., Spring 1987. (Telos Press).
"Paul Ricoeur as Another: how a great philosopher wrestled with his younger self", The Chronicle of Higher Education, October 14, 2005

References

Living people
Reed College alumni
21st-century American historians
21st-century American male writers
Graduate Center, CUNY faculty
People from Maplewood, New Jersey
Rice University faculty
Intellectual historians
Heidegger scholars
Walter Benjamin scholars
1952 births
Historians from New Jersey
American male non-fiction writers